Puducherry consists of 10 communes. Out of these, five communes are located in Puducherry district and the other five are located in Karaikal district

Puducherry is composed of three blocks, five municipalities, and ten communes. Puducherry and Karaikal have five communes each. The communes sub-divide into 98 village Panchayats. The administrative control of the communes resides with the Local Administration Department of the Government of Puducherry. Each commune is administered by a Commissioner. Birth and death registration take place in the offices of the communes. Various other licenses are issued by these offices.

List of communes: district and block wise

Puducherry District
Puducherry District comprises 71 Village Panchayats, five communes and two blocks, 2 municipalities.

Puducherry Municipality

Olugarate Municipality

Ariyankuppam Block
The three communes in Ariyankuppam Block are:
 Ariyankuppam Commune - 11 Village Panchayats
 Bahour Commune - 15 Village Panchayts
 Nettapakkam Commune - 11 Village Panchayats

Villianur Block
The 2 communes in Villianur Block are:
 Villianur Commune - 18 Village Panchayats
 Mannadipet Commune - 16 Village Panchayats

Karaikal District
Karaikal district comprises 27 Village Panchayats, five communes and one block.

Karaikal Block
The 5 communes in Karaikal Block are:
 Kottucherry Commune - 5 Village Panchayats
 Nedungadu Commune - 4  Village Panchayats
 Neravy Commune - 4 Village Panchayats
 Thirunallar Commune - 9 Village Panchayats
 Tirumalairayanpattinam Commune - 5 Village Panchayats

References

Puducherry-related lists